Ramilya Munavarovna Burangulova (born July 11, 1961) is a Russian marathon runner. She was born in Kandry-Kutuy, Bashkir Autonomous Soviet Socialist Republic.

Achievements
All results regarding marathon, unless stated otherwise

Personal bests
5000 metres - 16:00.66 min (1995)
Half marathon - 1:10:14 hrs
Marathon - 2:28:03 hrs (1993)

External links

1961 births
Living people
Russian female long-distance runners
Athletes (track and field) at the 1992 Summer Olympics
Athletes (track and field) at the 1996 Summer Olympics
Olympic athletes of the Unified Team
Olympic athletes of Russia
Russian female marathon runners
Soviet female marathon runners